The Landgericht (plural: Landgerichte), also called the Landtag in Switzerland, was a regional magistracy or court in the Holy Roman Empire that was responsible for high justice within a territory, such as a county (Grafschaft), on behalf of the territorial lord (e.g. the count).

Background and function 
These judicial bodies emerged during the Frankish period. There were usually several  thingsteads (Dingstätten) at which they would take place. It was thus a focal point for exercising the 'law of the land', the Landrecht. Arnold argues that, by 1200, the institutions of the Landfriede, the hereditary county and the Landgericht, if not identical, had "emerged as a collective legal structure par excellence which the princes exercised personally or through delegate judges from amongst their vassals, ministeriales and officials.

There were very different interpretations of the term Landgericht regionally. It corresponded to the term Landrecht, with which it was used synonymously, to distinguish it from other legal terms such as Stadtrecht ("town rights"), Lehnsrecht ("feudal rights") etc. During the course of its development the term encompassed both royal juridical courts as well as the those of other lords with relatively small areas of responsibility. There were imperial, royal, princely, ecclesial (monastic) and other Landgerichte.

In the Middle Ages, the Landgerichte came to have an enormous importance for the organisation and exercise of lordship, especially when one takes into account that about 90% of the population around the year 1300 were rural. There was a great variety of manifestations of the Landgerichte in the Middle Ages. Not until the emergence of a hierarchy of courts in the 16th century and the restructuring as part of citizens’ reforms of the 19th century was it possible to define and describe different types of Landgerichte.

Terminology 
The word Landgericht was also used to describe the territory over which the court exercised its responsibility. In addition, it can also describe the building in which a Landgericht is housed. In addition, there were regional terms for such courts; for example, the Gogericht in Saxony; the Freigericht in Westphalia, the Hesse and southwest Germany; and the Zentgericht in Franconia, and parts of the Duchy of Bavaria and Lotharingia.

Organisation 
Originally, all free men who were resident or owned land within the Hundertschaft, the Go or the Pflege were obliged to participate in the court (thing). From the mid-13th century ministeriales were also liable. County courts (Grafengerichte) under the king's ban (Königsbann) met every 18 weeks and were to be attended by all jurors (Schöffen). Every prince and lord who had been given juridical authority by the king, were to hold a Landgericht every 18 weeks, which had to be attended by all those over 24 living in the associated judicial district (Gerichtssprengel) or who owned a house in the same.

The Landgericht was responsible for property (freehold, estates) and inheritance, freedom processes and allegations of crime by the princes, their families and retinue against free men. The court personnel usually comprised the judge (Gerichtsherr), the presiding Landrichters (as representatives of the judge), a group of court 'members' (Beisitzer) and a court usher (Gerichtsbote) as an assistant.

References

Literature 
 Arnold, Benjamin (1991). Princes and territories in medieval Germany, Cambridge University Press, Cambridge and New York, .
 Friedrich Merzbacher, Heiner Lück: Article Landgericht, in: Albrecht Cordes, Heiner Lück, Dieter Werkmüller (eds.): Handwörterbuch zur deutschen Rechtsgeschichte (HRG), 2nd edn., Vol. 3, Berlin 2012, cols. 518–527.

External links 
 Veröffentlichungen zu Landgerichten in Opac of the Regesta Imperii

Legal history of the Holy Roman Empire